The 2016 Ecuador Open Quito was an ATP tennis tournament played on outdoor clay courts. It was the 2nd edition of the Ecuador Open Quito as part of the ATP World Tour 250 series of the 2016 ATP World Tour. It took place in Quito, Ecuador from February 1 through February 7, 2016.

Points and prize money

Point distribution

Prize money

Singles main-draw entrants

Seeds 

 Rankings were as of January 18, 2016.

Other entrants 
The following players received wildcards into the singles main draw:
  Gonzalo Escobar
  Alejandro González 
  Giovanni Lapentti

The following player received entry using a protected ranking:
  Pere Riba

The following players received entry from the qualifying draw:
  Jozef Kovalík
  Andrej Martin
  Renzo Olivo
  João Souza

Withdrawals 
Before the tournament
  Marco Cecchinato →replaced by  Alejandro Falla
  Andreas Haider-Maurer →replaced by  Horacio Zeballos
  Ivo Karlović →replaced by  Rogério Dutra Silva

Retirements 
  Feliciano López (fatigue)

Doubles main-draw entrants

Seeds 

 Rankings were as of January 18, 2016.

Other entrants 
The following pairs received wildcards into the doubles main draw:
  Emilio Gómez /  Roberto Quiroz
  Giovanni Lapentti /  Fernando Verdasco

The following pairs received entry as alternates:
  Dušan Lajović /  Franko Škugor

Withdrawals 
Before the tournament
  Fernando Verdasco (neck injury)
During the tournament
  Albert Ramos Viñolas (stomach illness)

Champions

Singles 

  Víctor Estrella Burgos def.  Thomaz Bellucci 4–6, 7–6(7–5), 6–2

Doubles

  Pablo Carreño Busta /  Guillermo Durán def.  Thomaz Bellucci /  Marcelo Demoliner 7–5, 6–4

References

External links 
 

Ecuador Open Quito
Ecuador Open (tennis)